Paul McDowell may refer to:

 Paul McDowell (actor) (1931–2016), English actor and writer
 Paul McDowell (Chief Inspector), former Chief Inspector of Probation for England and Wales
 Paul McDowell (rower) (1905–1962), American rower